Same-sex marriage in Portugal has been legal since 5 June 2010. The XVIII Constitutional Government of Portugal under Prime Minister José Sócrates introduced a bill for legalization in December 2009. It was passed by the Assembly of the Republic in February 2010, and was declared legally valid by the Portuguese Constitutional Court in April 2010. On 17 May 2010, President Aníbal Cavaco Silva ratified the law, making Portugal the sixth country in Europe and the eighth country in the world to allow same-sex marriage nationwide. The law was published in the Diário da República on 31 May 2010 and became effective on 5 June 2010.

Portugal has also recognized same-sex de facto unions, providing several of the rights and benefits of marriage, since 2001.

Background

De facto unions

A de facto union is a legally recognised union, providing couples, opposite-sex or same-sex, with similar rights and benefits as marriage. Same-sex de facto unions were established by Law no. 7/2001 (Lei n.º 7/2001) in 2001.

Constitutional Court ruling
On 1 February 2006, a lesbian couple applied for a marriage licence. Their application was refused, but the couple, Teresa Pires and Helena Paixão, promised to challenge the ban in court, saying that it discriminated against them on the basis of their sexual orientation. Discrimination based on sexual orientation is illegal under the Constitution of Portugal. In May 2007, a lower court rejected the motion, and the couple appealed to the Portuguese Constitutional Court. The Constitutional Court received the case in July 2007. Pires and Paixão's lawyer, Luís Grave Rodrigues, presented their arguments on 19 October 2007, including seven legal opinions (pareceres) from Portuguese professors of law arguing that the ban on same-sex marriage was unconstitutional.

On 9 July 2009, the Constitutional Court decided on a 3–2 vote that the Constitution did not demand the recognition of same-sex marriage, but also did not oppose it, and that the decision had to be made by the Assembly of the Republic.

Legislative action

2008
Two bills to legalize same-sex marriage were presented to Parliament on 10 October 2008. The bills were introduced separately by the Left Bloc (BE) and the Green Party (PEV). Both bills were rejected by Parliament on opposition from the governing Socialist Party (PS) and the main opposition Social Democratic Party (PSD).

2009–2010
Prime Minister José Sócrates said on 18 January 2009 that, if re-elected in the September 2009 elections, he planned to introduce a bill to grant same-sex couples the right to marry. While the bill did not contemplate adoption, most LGBT organizations in Portugal supported the measure as an important step. In March 2009, Jorge Lacão, the Secretary of State for the Presidency of the Council of Ministers, confirmed that the Socialist Government intended to legalize same-sex marriage if re-elected in 2009. Manuela Ferreira Leite, the leader of the conservative Social Democratic Party, expressed her opposition to the recognition of same-sex marriage.

In May 2009, a grassroots movement, the Movement for Equality in Access to Civil Marriage, was formed to campaign for the proposed same-sex marriage law. It attracted the support of several Portuguese celebrities, including Nobel Prize winner José Saramago and the Mayor of Lisbon, António Costa. In October 2009, the newly re-elected Sócrates made an assurance that the Socialist Party would move ahead with its campaign promise of legalizing same-sex marriage. The proposition received strong support from the Left Bloc, with its parliamentary leader, Francisco Louçã, presenting his own bill to legalize same-sex marriage. In mid-October 2009, Lacão said it was likely that same-sex marriage would be legalised in early 2010. On 3 November 2009, José Ribeiro e Castro, a deputy from the CDS – People's Party, called for a referendum but the Prime Minister, the Socialist Party and the Left Bloc rejected the idea.

On 4 November 2009, Francisco Assis, the parliamentary leader of the Socialist Party, said that the same-sex marriage bill would be voted on soon and confirmed that the bill would not allow same-sex couples to adopt children. The government gave its official approval to the same-sex marriage bill on 17 December 2009. On 8 January 2010, after a debate which included the intervention of Prime Minister Sócrates, the Assembly of the Republic passed the bill in first reading by 126 votes to 97, and rejected bills introduced by the Left Bloc and the Green Party, as well as a measure to create civil unions submitted by the PSD. The Constitutional Affairs Committee approved the bill on 10 February, and it passed its final parliamentary vote on 11 February. The legislation was sent to President Aníbal Cavaco Silva on 24 February 2010. 

On 13 March 2010, Cavaco Silva asked the Constitutional Court to verify whether the bill was constitutional. On 8 April 2010, the Constitutional Court ruled (11–2) for the constitutionality of the bill, with three members concluding that the Constitution requires the recognition of same-sex marriages. The ruling was published in the official gazette on 28 April, giving the President twenty days to sign, or veto, the bill. On 17 May 2010, Cavaco Silva signed the bill into law. The law was published in the Diário da República on 31 May and became effective on 5 June 2010. On 7 June, Teresa Pires and Helena Paixão, the couple who had originally challenged the same-sex marriage ban in court in 2006, became the first same-sex couple to marry in Portugal, exchanging vows at the registry office in Lisbon. The first same-sex marriage in the Azores was performed on 29 August 2010 on Terceira.

Article 1577 of the Portuguese Civil Code was amended to read: Marriage is a contract between two persons who intend to found a family through a full communion of life, in accordance with the provisions of this Code.

2012–2016
On 24 February 2012, Parliament rejected two bills which would have allowed married same-sex couples to adopt children. On 17 May 2013, Parliament rejected a bill to allow same-sex couples to adopt children in a 104–77 vote. On the same day, Parliament approved a bill in first reading to allow married same-sex couples to adopt their partner's children (i.e. stepchild adoption). However, that bill was rejected in second reading on 14 March 2014 in a 107–112 vote.

On 17 January 2014, Parliament approved a resolution to hold a referendum on adoption rights for same-sex couples. On 28 January, President Cavaco Silva asked the Constitutional Court to verify whether the resolution was constitutional. On 19 February 2014, the court declared the resolution unconstitutional, and Cavaco Silva vetoed it the following day.

On 20 November 2015, Parliament approved 5 bills granting adoption rights to same-sex spouses in first reading. The bills were sent to the Committee for Constitutional Affairs, Rights, Freedoms and Guarantees. On 16 December, the committee merged the bills into one project and voted for its approval. On 18 December, the bill was approved by Parliament in its second, final vote. President Cavaco Silva vetoed the bill on 23 January 2016, with the decision being announced publicly on 25 January. On 10 February 2016, the veto was overridden by Parliament. The law was published in the official journal on 29 February, and took effect the first day of the first month after its publication (i.e. 1 March 2016).

Marriage statistics
One year after the law came into force, approximately 380 same-sex marriages had taken place in Portugal.

Figures for 2020 are lower than previous years because of the restrictions in place due to the COVID-19 pandemic.

Opposition
A number of groups opposed legalizing same-sex marriage during the process of discussion and have continued to do so after ratification. The Catholic Church in Portugal was opposed to the law and, while Portugal is a constitutional secular country, its status as a historically Catholic country was also a reason for the media sensationalism which heightened the controversy over the law. On 13 May 2010, during an official visit to Portugal four days before the ratification of the law, Pope Benedict XVI affirmed his opposition to same-sex marriage, describing it as "insidious and dangerous".

A few months earlier, 5,000 people had demonstrated against the legalization of same-sex marriage in a march in Lisbon.

Marriage norms
On 19 July 2010, the Institute of Registries and Notary (Instituto dos Registos e do Notariado) published the following rules on marriage:
 Marriages conducted abroad must be transcribed by civil registries even if they were performed before the legalization of same-sex marriage;
 Marriages performed under alternative legislation to civil marriage, such as civil partnerships and civil unions, cannot be transcribed;
 Foreign nationals can marry even if marriage between same-sex couples is not recognized in their country of origin;
 Same-sex foreign nationals can marry in Portugal without the need to establish residency;
 Co-adoptions with same-sex couples performed abroad are recognised in Portugal. (Amended in 2016)

Public opinion
The 2015 Eurobarometer found that 61% of Portuguese people thought same-sex marriage should be allowed throughout Europe, while 33% were opposed.

A Pew Research Center poll, conducted between April and August 2017 and published in May 2018, showed that 59% of Portuguese people supported same-sex marriage, 28% were opposed and 13% did not know or refused to answer. When divided by religion, 82% of religiously unaffiliated people, 64% of non-practicing Christians and 43% of church-attending Christians supported same-sex marriage. Opposition was 14% among 18–34-year-olds.

The 2019 Eurobarometer found that 74% of Portuguese people thought same-sex marriage should be allowed throughout Europe, while 20% were opposed.

See also
De facto union in Portugal
LGBT rights in Portugal
Recognition of same-sex unions in Europe

Notes

References

LGBT rights in Portugal
Portugal
2010 in LGBT history